is a city in southern Shiga Prefecture, Japan. (The word 'Kōka' is often rendered as 'Koga' in English, especially when referring to the "Koga Ninja".) , the city had an estimated population of  89,619 in 36708 households and a population density of 190 persons per km².

Geography
Kōka occupies the entire southern end of Shiga Prefecture, and is thus long east-to-west. At the eastern end of Kōka, the southern ridge of the Suzuka Mountains with one elevation of 1000 meters runs from northeast to southwest, forming the boundary with Mie Prefecture. The highest altitude point in Kōka is Mount Amagoi in this range.

Neighboring municipalities
Shiga Prefecture
Ōtsu
Rittō
Konan
Higashiōmi
Ryūō
Hino
Kyoto Prefecture
Wazuka
Minamiyamashiro
Ujitawara
Mie Prefecture
Yokkaichi
Suzuka
Kameyama
Iga
Komono

Climate
Kōka has a Humid subtropical climate (Köppen Cfa) characterized by warm summers and cool winters with light to no snowfall.  The average annual temperature in Kōka is 13.6 °C. The average annual rainfall is 1673 mm with September as the wettest month. The temperatures are highest on average in August, at around 25.4 °C, and lowest in January, at around 2.1 °C.

Demographics
Per Japanese census data, the population of Kōka has recently plateaued after several decades of growth.

History
Kōka is part of ancient  Ōmi Province. During the Sengoku period, the area was a center for the Kōga-ryū school of ninjutsu, in rivalry with Iga  The area was on the route of the Tōkaidō highway connecting Kyoto with Edo and the eastern provinces of Japan. Minakuchi-juku was both a post station and also a castle town for Minakuchi Domain, which ruled over parts of the area of Kōka during the Edo period. The village of Minakuchi was established on April 1, 1889 within Kōka District, Shiga with the creation of the modern municipalities system. It was raised to town status on August 18, 1894. On October 1, 2004, Minakuchi merged with the towns of Kōka, Kōnan, Shigaraki and Tsuchiyama (all from Kōka District) to form the city of Kōka.

Government
Kōka has a mayor-council form of government with a directly elected mayor and a unicameral city council of 24 members. Kōka contributes three members to the Shiga Prefectural Assembly. In terms of national politics, the city is part of Shiga 4th district of the lower house of the Diet of Japan.

Economy
Kōka is traditionally known for its production of ceramics, most notably Shigaraki ware, as well as agriculture and forestry. Light manufacturing is concentrated to pharmaceuticals.

Education
Kōka has 21 public elementary schools and six public middle schools operated by the city government and one middle school operated by the Shiga Prefectural Department of Education. The prefecture also operates four public high schools.

Transport

Railway
 JR West – Kusatsu Line
  -  -   -  - 
 Ohmi Railway – Main Line
  -   -  -  - 
Shigaraki Kōgen Railway - Shigaraki Line
  -  -  -  -  -

Highway
 Shin-Meishin Expressway

Sister city relations
  DeWitt, Michigan, USA (renewed 2005)
  Marshall, Michigan, USA (renewed 2005)
  Traverse City, Michigan, USA (1969; renewed 2005)

Local attractions
 Miho Museum
 Minakuchi Castle
 Minakuchi-juku
 Tsuchiyama-juku
 site of Shigaraki Palace, National Historic Site
 Tarumi Saiō Tongū Site, National Historic Site
 Minakuchi Okayama Castle ruins

Noted people
Mineichi Iwanaga, politician
Kaoruko Himeno, author

References

External links 

  
  
Mapple Koka city -Secrets to Enjoying Kōka- Guide map of Kōka city

Cities in Shiga Prefecture
Kōka, Shiga